Real Story Group, known as CMS Watch until February 2010, is a digital workplace and marketing technology analyst firm headquartered in Silver Spring, United States with offices in Boston, New York City, Philadelphia, Washington DC, Bangalore, and Delhi. The company provides advisory services to buyers of business technology and publishes reports on various areas including web content management, enterprise mobile platforms, digital marketing technology, enterprise search, digital asset management, media asset management, SharePoint, and social software. The company asserts that unlike many other market players, it works only for technology solutions buyers and never for vendors.

The company has been founded by Tony Byrne, a software analyst.

Real Story Group has a reputation in the tech media for being comparatively more critical of technology vendors than other analyst firms, for example, criticizing Google's Enterprise Search Appliance for putting "marketing a couple of steps ahead of engineering," noting the "unreal expectations created by sales messages about the advantages and benefits of Digital Asset Management systems," and warning customers about vendors touting expansive marketing suites.

Media firms have also tended to take note of Real Story Group's "Vendor Maps."

References

External links

Research and analysis firms
Research and analysis firms of the United States